Carex monostachya is a species of sedge native to the mountains of East Africa.

Distribution and ecology
It grows in the upper bamboo and Hagenia forests, in grassland in the ericaceous belt, and in shallow water near glaciers.

Carex monostachya can be the dominant species in the bogs found on the mountains' higher reaches. Other plants found in the same habitat include the giant senecios of the genus Dendrosenecio, the gentian Swertia crassiuscula, the buttercup Ranunculus oreophytus and the thistle Carduus keniensis.

Taxonomy
Carex monostachya was described by Achille Richard in 1850, in his .

References

monostachya
Afromontane flora
Flora of Ethiopia
Flora of Kenya
Flora of Tanzania
Plants described in 1850
Alpine flora